The West Village Houses are a collection of 42 walk-up buildings in New York City's West Village that contain 420 apartments. They were built with the support of New York City and New York State through its Mitchell-Lama Housing Program. They were championed by Jane Jacobs and intended to be built on a human scale in keeping with her ideals.

History 
The houses are scattered in an area bounded by Morton, West, Bank and Washington Streets. In 1961, New York Mayor Wagner planned to redevelop that area with high rise housing. West Village resident Jane Jacobs led an effort to stop that development in favor of the West Village Houses which were smaller-scale and preserved existing structures. Perkins and Will designed the buildings. The effort to build the houses was finally approved in 1969, higher costs required a second approval in 1972 and then construction began. Because of their long construction during a period of high inflation, when they were completed in 1975 common charges for prospective residents were high,  they had difficulty finding residents and required further subsidy.

In 2002 the owner of the property, the Island Capital Group, indicated that it might like to buy out of the Mitchell-Lama Program and convert the units to market rate. The Bloomberg administration worked out an arrangement to sell the units to the tenants but preserve affordability for those who wanted to continue to rent. The tax abatements that facilitated this conversion expire in 2018 and in November 2017 developer Madison Equities offered to purchase the properties and redevelop them as high rises.

References 

Housing in New York City
Multi-building developments in New York City
Redevelopment projects in the United States
Residential buildings in Manhattan
West Village